Hudson Hoagland (December 5, 1899 – March 4, 1982) was an American neuroscientist, president of the  American Academy of Arts and Sciences, from 1961 to 1964. 

Originally from Rockaway, New Jersey, he graduated from Columbia University, Massachusetts Institute of Technology, and Harvard University, and was a Guggenheim fellow.    His scientific specialty was electroencephalography. He died in 1982 in Southboro, Massachusetts.

Legacy 
In 1985, he co-founded the Worcester Foundation, now merged with the University of Massachusetts Medical School. The foundation funds biomedical research at Chan Medical School,   a foundation that developed the birth control pill.

Works

References 

1899 births
1982 deaths
Columbia University alumni
Massachusetts Institute of Technology alumni
Harvard University alumni
People from Rockaway, New Jersey